
The Alabama Museum of Natural History is the state's natural history museum, located in Smith Hall at the University of Alabama campus in Tuscaloosa. The oldest museum in the state, it was founded in 1831. The exhibits depict the natural diversity of Alabama from the Age of Dinosaurs, the Coal Age, and the Ice Age. Collections include items relating to geology, zoology, mineralogy, paleontology, ethnology, history, and photography. The Grand Gallery Exhibition Hall houses a replica of a Basilosaurus cetoides, an Eocene whale that has been designated as the State Fossil.  Exhibits of special interest include the skull of an American mastodon dredged from the Tombigbee River near Demopolis and the Hodges meteorite. The latter hit a woman as it fell to earth near Sylacauga on November 30, 1954. The museum sponsors expeditions throughout the year, as it has since 1979.

History

The current home for the Alabama Museum of Natural History, Smith Hall, is named in honor of Dr. Eugene Allen Smith.  He was appointed as state geologist in 1873 and spent nearly forty years surveying, mapping and collecting scientific specimens throughout the state.  The cornerstone for Smith Hall was laid on May 28, 1907.  Construction of Smith Hall was completed in fall 1909 and it was formally dedicated on May 5, 1910.

Eugene A. Smith recruited collector Herbert Huntington Smith (no relation) as the museum's curator. Herbert H. Smith directed the Museum under Eugene A. Smith from 1910 till his death in 1919. During this period the Alabama Museum of Natural History was very active in acquiring natural history objects by collecting, trading and donation, especially fossil and recent mollusks of Alabama. Large collections of tertiary shells were made and traded to other institutions and individuals. The two Smiths generously sent specimens to local and out-of-state researchers, generating many publications on Alabama material. The museum also improved its exhibits and provided identified sets of natural history objects to schools in Alabama.

Herbert Smith's wife, Amelia “Daisy” Woolworth Smith, was also a collector and worked for the museum, but with scant public attention, as this would have been thought of as immodest at the time. Remarkably, after her husband's unexpected death, Daisy Smith replaced him as Acting Curator, making her one of the few women to direct a natural history museum in the early twentieth century. Her endeavors included seeing her late husband's malacological projects through to completion, which she accomplished by recruiting Calvin Goodrich and other malacologists.

Architecture

Smith Hall consists of a three-story central block, built to house the Alabama Museum of Natural History, and adjoining two-story north and south wings.  The north wing originally housed the Department of Biology with the south wing housing the Department of Geology.  The Department of Geology currently occupies both wings.  The architecture of Smith Hall mirrors on a smaller scale the design and layout of several large natural history museums that were also built during the early years of the 20th century in Chicago, New York and Washington, D.C.

The building is designed in a Classical Revival style known as Beaux-Arts.  The exterior features an engaged colonnade of eight Ionic columns raised above a podium-like ground floor.  The main entrance is at ground level through a pedimented stone doorway.  Immediately inside the entrance is a center hall dominated by a sweeping staircase made of Alabama marble and supported by Alabama-manufactured iron.  The staircase leads to the Grand Gallery Exhibition Hall on the second floor.  The Grand Gallery is ringed by a colonnade of monumental Corinthian columns supporting an entablature and cornice.  A barrel vaulted ceiling above the cornice contains skylights that provide the space with natural light.

See also

List of museums in Alabama

References

University of Alabama
Museums established in 1831
Natural history museums in Alabama
Museums in Tuscaloosa, Alabama
Dinosaur museums in the United States
Beaux-Arts architecture in Alabama
Paleontology in Alabama
1831 establishments in Alabama